Ali Otayf (born on 1 March 1988) is a Saudi Arabian football player who plays as a midfielder. He played in the Pro League for Al-Shabab, Al-Raed, Al-Ettifaq and Al-Orobah.

External links
slstat.com Profile

1988 births
Living people
Saudi Arabian footballers
Al-Shabab FC (Riyadh) players
Al-Orobah FC players
Al-Raed FC players
Al-Shoulla FC players
Ettifaq FC players
Place of birth missing (living people)
Saudi First Division League players
Saudi Professional League players
Association football midfielders